Brigitte Girardin (born 12 January 1953 in Verdun, Meuse, France) is a French diplomat and politician. She was the minister of Overseas France under Jacques Chirac from 7 May 2002 to 2 June 2005.

Biography
In 1976, Girardin first worked for the French government at the Ministry of Foreign Affairs. In 1978, she was in charge of economic relations between Francophone nations in Africa.

In early 1998, Girardin was appointed as the Senior Administrator of the French Southern and Antarctic Lands until January 2000.

In 2002, Girardin was appointed as the Minister of Overseas under Prime Minister, Jean-Pierre Raffarin's government. In May, 2003, Girardin met with the Spanish Secretary for European Affairs, Ramón de Miguel, and Portuguese Deputy Foreign Minister, Carlos da Costa Neves to demand the European Union add aid for the countries' ultra-peripheral regions to the constitution.

In 2005, Girardin worked as the Minister for Cooperation, Development and the Francophonie, where she made several deals between France and Francophone nations. She visited and signed economic agreements with Cameroon to provide $680 million in debt relief aid, Comoros, granting €88 million, Mauritania, signing financial accords for developmental projects, the Democratic Republic of Congo, Senegal, providing €110 million in aid, and Canada.

Girardin was also a member of UMP, a political party founded by Dominique de Villepin based on his republic of solidarity movement. She was the Secretary General of the party until its closure in 2011.
   
On 17 April 2012, Girardin announced that she will be voting for French president candidate François Hollande in the first round of the 2012 French presidential election.

In May 2015, Girardin joined the Court of Auditors.

References

1953 births
Living people
French politicians
French women diplomats
People from Meuse (department)
People from Verdun